Roanoke was one of the largest wooden ships ever constructed.

Service 
Roanoke was a four-masted barque built by Messrs. A. Sewall and Co. in 1892 on the Kennebec River at Bath, Maine, in the United States. With the exception of Great Republic and the six-masted wooden schooner Wyoming (3,730.54 GRT, 450 ft length overall) she was the largest wooden ship ever built in an American yard. Her gross register tonnage was 3,347, but on a draft of  she could stow away 2,000 additional tons. Into her construction went 1,250,000 board feet of yellow pine, 14,000 cubic feet (396.4 cubic meters) of oak, 98,000 treenails, and 550 hackmatack knees.

Loss 
Roanoke left New York City on her final voyage in June 1904 and was involved in a serious collision with the British steamship Llangibby off the coast of South America in August 1904, requiring repairs for three months in Rio de Janeiro, Brazil.  After delivering cargo to Australia, Roanoke was loading chromium ore near Nouméa, New Caledonia, when she was destroyed by fire on the night of August 10, 1905.

References
 Rowe, William Hutchinson; 1948; The Maritime History of Maine: Three Centuries of Shipbuilding & Seafaring; W. W. Norton; New York; p. 333

Notes 

Ships built in Bath, Maine
1892 ships
Barques
Maritime incidents in 1904
Maritime incidents in 1905
Ship fires
Shipwrecks in the Pacific Ocean